Hoplocorypha dentata is a species of praying mantis found in Kenya, Tanzania, and Zimbabwe.

See also
List of mantis genera and species

References

Hoplocorypha
Mantodea of Africa
Insects described in 1916